Wairakei is a small settlement, and geothermal area a few kilometres north of Taupō, in the centre of the North Island of New Zealand, on the Waikato River. It is part of the Taupō Volcanic Zone and features several natural geysers, hot pools. boiling mud pools, and the Wairakei Power Station, a major geothermal electric power generating station.

The station was the second large-scale geothermal facility worldwide, and was commissioned in 1958. It was listed in the book 70 Wonders Of The Modern World published in 2000 by Reader's Digest to record The Eventful 20th Century.

The settlement, referred to as Wairakei Village, was constructed to house the workers of both the power station and the neighbouring Aratiatia hydro power station.

From 31 October 2022 it had buses to Taupō, Mondays to Fridays.

Demographics
The settlement is part of the larger Wairakei-Broadlands statistical area.

Wairakei Village had a population of 507 at the 2018 New Zealand census, an increase of 54 people (11.9%) since the 2013 census, and an increase of 42 people (9.0%) since the 2006 census. There were 132 households, comprising 267 males and 240 females, giving a sex ratio of 1.11 males per female, with 153 people (30.2%) aged under 15 years, 114 (22.5%) aged 15 to 29, 204 (40.2%) aged 30 to 64, and 36 (7.1%) aged 65 or older.

Ethnicities were 68.6% European/Pākehā, 47.9% Māori, 6.5% Pacific peoples, 1.8% Asian, and 0.6% other ethnicities. People may identify with more than one ethnicity.

Although some people chose not to answer the census's question about religious affiliation, 69.2% had no religion, 18.3% were Christian, and 3.6% had Māori religious beliefs.

Of those at least 15 years old, 21 (5.9%) people had a bachelor's or higher degree, and 87 (24.6%) people had no formal qualifications. 27 people (7.6%) earned over $70,000 compared to 17.2% nationally. The employment status of those at least 15 was that 174 (49.2%) people were employed full-time, 54 (15.3%) were part-time, and 36 (10.2%) were unemployed.

Wairakei-Broadlands statistical area

Wairakei-Broadlands had a population of 1,236 at the 2018 New Zealand census, an increase of 84 people (7.3%) since the 2013 census, and an increase of 144 people (13.2%) since the 2006 census. There were 387 households, comprising 648 males and 588 females, giving a sex ratio of 1.1 males per female. The median age was 31.9 years (compared with 37.4 years nationally), with 315 people (25.5%) aged under 15 years, 261 (21.1%) aged 15 to 29, 555 (44.9%) aged 30 to 64, and 105 (8.5%) aged 65 or older.

Ethnicities were 74.8% European/Pākehā, 36.7% Māori, 4.4% Pacific peoples, 3.6% Asian, and 1.9% other ethnicities. People may identify with more than one ethnicity.

The percentage of people born overseas was 12.9, compared with 27.1% nationally.

Although some people chose not to answer the census's question about religious affiliation, 64.1% had no religion, 22.3% were Christian, 2.7% had Māori religious beliefs, 1.2% were Hindu, 0.2% were Muslim, 0.2% were Buddhist and 0.7% had other religions.

Of those at least 15 years old, 75 (8.1%) people had a bachelor's or higher degree, and 210 (22.8%) people had no formal qualifications. The median income was $32,700, compared with $31,800 nationally. 117 people (12.7%) earned over $70,000 compared to 17.2% nationally. The employment status of those at least 15 was that 516 (56.0%) people were employed full-time, 138 (15.0%) were part-time, and 51 (5.5%) were unemployed.

Education

Notable people 
 Louise Rennison, lived here as a teenager

References

External links 
Wairakei - information at Environment Waikato
Wairakei Geyser (1933 article)

Geysers of New Zealand
Taupō District
Landforms of Waikato
Populated places on the Waikato River
Whakamaru caldera complex